Kubic is a surname. Notable people with the surname include:

Rick Kubic, Chicago-based percussionist
 (born 1976), Polish-born London-based conceptual artist

See also
Kubica

Polish-language surnames